The Port of Lake Charles is an industrial port based in the city of Lake Charles, Louisiana, U.S.A. It is a major employer in Lake Charles. It is the twelfth-busiest port in the United States according to the American Association of Port Authorities U.S. Port Ranking by Cargo Tonnage, 2013 report and the 83rd-busiest in the world in terms of tonnage according to the American Association of Port Authorities World Port Rankings 2013 report.  The Calcasieu Ship Channel provides direct access to the Gulf of Mexico, 34 miles downstream from the city docks. The ship channel intersects the Gulf Intracoastal Waterway just north of Calcasieu Lake. The Ship Channel has a project depth of 40 feet and a bottom width of 400 feet.

The Port of Lake Charles, also known as the Lake Charles Harbor and Terminal District, has a variety of components including City Docks, Bulk Terminals, the Industrial Canal, Sempra Cameron LNG, Industrial Park East, and Westlake Terminal. The major commodity on the river is crude oil, while the major export is bagged food aid for the world. Other commodities include Petroleum coke, Calcined petroleum coke, Limestone, Ceramic Proppants, Anode Butts, Gasoline, Diesel, Jet-Fuel, Caustic Soda, Styrene Monomers, and a variety of other combustibles.  The port is also the future site of the $1.2 billion Syngas Plan. L'Auberge du Lac Resort is located on Port property and a major contributor to the Port's bottom line, contributing millions each month for leasing the land.

The current director of the Port of Lake Charles is William "Bill" Rase.

References

External links
Port of Lake Charles Official site

Lake Charles
Buildings and structures in Lake Charles, Louisiana
1924 establishments in Louisiana